Magnolia ernestii, the yellow lily-tree, is a species of plant in the family Magnoliaceae. It is endemic to China. It is threatened by habitat loss.

References

Further reading
XIANG, Cheng-hua, et al. "Genetic Diversity of Endangered Plant Michelia wilsonii [J]." Journal of Northwest Forestry University 5 (2009): 016.

ernestii
Endemic flora of China
Trees of China
Taxonomy articles created by Polbot